Roy Anthony Cousins (born 1949 in Kingston, Jamaica) is a Jamaican reggae singer, producer, and record label owner, known for being lead singer and co creator of The Royals, his productions of artists such as Charlie Chaplin, Prince Far I, Scientist, Winston Francis, Earl Sixteen, Devon Russell, Junior Reid, Don Carlos, Pablove Black, Ken Parker, Knowledge, The Gaylads, The Meditations, Prince Hammer and Cornell Campbell, and his record labels, Uhuru, Tamoki, Wambesi, Dove & Tamoki-Wambesi/Tamoki Wambesi Dove.

Biography
Cousins worked for the Jamaican Post Office for many years after he left school, and had formed his first vocal group in 1962, to attend the Junior Festival Competition. In 1965 he formed a vocal group, initially known as The Tempests, and later as The Royals. Frustrated with his dealings with record labels, he started his own Uhuru label in 1971. This soon folded, but he returned with the Tamoki label in 1972 and the Wambesi label in 1974. He also began producing other artists, including Gregory Isaacs' "Way of Life" in 1974, which established the singer as a star.

In June 1977, Cousins left his Post Office job to concentrate full-time on music, resulting in 1978's Pick Up The Pieces album, a collection of tracks from Royals 1970s singles, which is now considered one of the great reggae albums. Its success led to a contract with Ballistic Records, licensed to United Artists, with two further Royals albums following. Cousins-produced dub albums also appeared (Freedom Fighters Dub and Liberated Dub).

In 1979, cataracts almost led to Cousins losing his sight, and after recovering, he began to concentrate on production, introducing the deejay Charlie Chaplin with a series of LPs, and producing artists such as Cornell Campbell, Earl 16, Naggo Morris, and The Meditations. Cousins produced Prince Far I's final album in 1983, Umkhonto We Sizwe, the chanter being fatally shot before it was finished. This prompted Cousins to emigrate to Liverpool, England, where he set up a record shop, Cousins Cove, and continues to release records on his Tamoki-Wambesi and Dove labels, both from his back-catalogue, and new recordings of visiting Jamaican artists. Another classic Cousins-produced track from this era is "Skanky Producer" which features the DJ Charlie Chaplin and Black Uhuru singers Don Carlos and Junior Reid.

References

External links
Roy Cousins at Roots Archives
Roy Cousins productions at ReggaeID
Roy Cousins at discogs.com

1949 births
Musicians from Kingston, Jamaica
Jamaican record producers
Jamaican reggae musicians
Living people